The U.S. Post Office and Courthouse–Prescott Main, in Prescott, Arizona, was built in 1931.  It was or is also known as Prescott Main Post Office and Courthouse and Prescott Main Post Office.  It was listed on the National Register of Historic Places in 1985.  It is a Beaux Arts architecture building and is NRHP-listed for its architecture.

The Post Office steps are made of porphyritic granite from Minnesota, containing large 1-inch phenocrysts of orthoclase feldspar. The original plans called for using local Prescott Granodiorite, as at the nearby Courthouse. The post office lobby is clad in fine veined Indiana marble. The side room in the northwest corner of the lobby has noteworthy wavy-texture marble.

Gallery

See also 
List of United States post offices

References

External links
 prescottazhistory

Prescott
Beaux-Arts architecture in Arizona
Prescott
Government buildings completed in 1931
Buildings and structures in Prescott, Arizona
1931 establishments in Arizona
National Register of Historic Places in Prescott, Arizona